{{DISPLAYTITLE:C10H12N2O5}}
The molecular formula C10H12N2O5 (molar mass: 240.21 g/mol, exact mass: 240.0746 u) may refer to:

 Dinoseb, an herbicide also known as 6-sec-butyl-2,4-dinitrophenol
 Dinoterb, an herbicide